Joseph Howlett (August 4, 1943 – November 18, 2004) is a former Democratic member of the Pennsylvania House of Representatives.

References

Democratic Party members of the Pennsylvania House of Representatives
Living people
1943 births